Hakimabad (also Romanized as Ḩakīmābād, Akīm Ābad, and Hakīm Ābād) is a village in Radkan Rural District, in the Central District of Chenaran County, Razavi Khorasan Province, Iran. At the 2006 census, its population was 942, in 220 families.

References 

Populated places in Chenaran County